1st Lithuanian Dragoon Regiment was a Prussian Lithuanian dragoon regiment of the Royal Prussian Army. The regiment was formed in 1717 and disbanded in 1919. This regiment was one of the eldest in the whole Prussian army.

The regiment was recruited almost exclusively from volunteers from its immediate homeland, i.e. Lithuania Minor, and was well reputed in the army at all times for having the best horses and riders. In the memoirs of the inhabitants of Lithuania Minor it is written that they were proud of serving in this regiment.

18th century 
On 19 April 1717, King Frederick William I of Prussia ordered major general  to form a regiment from 780 Saxon cavalrymen and dragoons, which Augustus II the Strong gifted the Prussian King. Already in May, von Wuthenau divided the regiment into eight companies. The uniform consisted of a white coat with light blue embroidering, because of which the regiment was called the "Porcelain regiment". In December, the regiment was ordered to march to Insterburg, Tilsit, Ragnit, Goldap, Stallupönen and Pillkallen. In 1718, the whole regiment was assembled in its entirety to a single place for military exercise in Insterburg and by the August of that year, the regiment already had ten companies. In 1725, it was established that every company would have 110 dragoons, and each company was renamed to squadrons.

The regiment von Cosel maintained the same uniform and was assigned all of the same garrisons except Tilsit. The dragoon regiment von Dockum remained in Tilsit with its five squadrons and received white coats with red embroidering. After a year, the regiment received silver timpani. The dragoon regiment von Dockum was later called the 7th Dragoon regiment.

In the period between 1734 and 1746, the regiment was often relocated to various places such as Berlin, Magdeburg, Potsdam or Tilsit. Finally, in 1746, Tilsit was established as the regiment's permanent garrison.

First Silesian War (1740-1742) 
During the First Silesian War, the regiment fought in the Battle of Chotusitz with the Imperial and Royal von Birkenfeld Cuirassier regiment. The dragoon regiment's Leibstandarte was lost when the enemies grenadiers seized it from the seriously wounded junker von Roop. The regiment lost four officers and 152 soldiers, with six officers and 71 soldiers being wounded. In addition, three officers and 280 soldiers were taken prisoners of war.

Second Silesian War (1744–1745) 
During the Second Silesian War, adjutant lieutenant von Blankenburg lost the timpani and flag in the skirmish near Niederzehren. However, in the battle of Kesselsdorf, the dragoon regiment attacked the Saxon Karabiniers-garde and mounted grenadiers. The Lithuanian dragoon regiment defeated the Saxon Foot Guard and also the Saxon infantry regiment Niesemeuschel. The victorious regiment took away the flags of both of these regiments. In addition, the regiment seized the flag and silver timpani of the Saxon Karabiniers-garde.

19th century

Napoleonic wars 
After the Treaties of Tilsit and the cabinet's order of 14 September 1808, regiments were no longer named after their commanders. During the Prussian Army's reorganization, the regiment was initially called the East Prussian Dragoon Regiment (Ostpreußisches Dragoner-Regiment), and after the cabinet's order of 14 September 1808, the regiment was called the 3rd Dragoon Regiment. The Lithuanian Dragoon Regiment was at first established in Tilžė and Įsrūtis.

Two of the regiment's squadrons were made part of the 1st Mobile Dragoon Regiment, which was part of Yorck's Auxiliary Prussian Corps. This Corps fought on Napoleon's side in the French invasion of Russia in 1812. Later, the regiment fought in Germany and France in 1813 and 1814. In the Battle of Leipzig, the regiment captured a French Imperial Eagle.

After the Napoleonic wars 
Circa 1815–1816, the regiment's soldiers were dispersed into other parts of the Prussian Kingdom, i.e. Berlin, Demmin or Tilžė. In between 1860 and 1866, the regiment was garrisoned in different parts of East Prussia, e.g. Įsrūtis or Ragainė. Finally, from 1879, the regiment was located only in Tilžė.

20th century

World War I 
Even until the end of the First World War, the signs outside the soldiers' barracks were in Lithuanian and German languages.

Commanders 
The regimental commanders were the following:

Legacy 
A statue commemorating the regiment's fallen soldiers was built after World War I.

See also
List of Imperial German cavalry regiments

References

Sources 

 
Cavalry regiments of the Prussian Army
Lithuanian units of the Royal Prussian Army